Paranga (Poranča) is an urban locality (an urban-type settlement) and the administrative center of Paranginsky District of the Mari El Republic, Russia. As of the 2010 Census, its population was 5,985.

Administrative and municipal status
Within the framework of administrative divisions, Paranga serves as the administrative center of Paranginsky District. As an administrative division, the urban-type settlement of Paranga, together with one rural locality (the village of Lyazhberdino), is incorporated within Paranginsky District as Paranga Urban-Type Settlement (an administrative division of the district). As a municipal division, Paranga Urban-Type Settlement is incorporated within Paranginsky Municipal District as Paranga Urban Settlement.

References

Notes

Sources

Urban-type settlements in the Mari El Republic
